Never Too Young is an American daytime serial that aired on ABC from September 27, 1965 to June 24, 1966 and was the first soap opera geared towards a teen audience. The show premiered on ABC on the same day as The Nurses.

Synopsis
The series, which featured Tony Dow of Leave it to Beaver and Tommy Rettig of Lassie fame, was set in Malibu, California. Never Too Young chronicled the lives of a group of teens and their parents. Stories were told from the point of view of Alfy (David Watson), the owner of the local beach hangout, "The High Dive".

The series featured several musical guests who performed at The High Dive, including: The Castaways, The Sunrays, Marvin Gaye, Johnny Rivers, Paul Revere & the Raiders, Mel Carter, Freddie Cannon, Ramsey Lewis Trio and The Girls.

The series was replaced by the ABC gothic soap opera Dark Shadows.

Cast
 Merry Anders.....Aunt Alice
 Michael Blodgett.....Tad
 Jan Clayton......Mrs. Porter
 Pat Connelly.....Barbara
 Tony Dow.....Chet
 Joy Harmon.....Chet's girlfriend
 Robin Grace......Joy
 John Lupton.....Frank
 Dack Rambo.....Tim
 Tommy Rettig......Jo Jo
 Carol Sydes.....Susan
 David Watson.....Alfy
 Patrice Wymore.....Rhoda

References

External links
  

1965 American television series debuts
1966 American television series endings
1960s American drama television series
American Broadcasting Company original programming
American television soap operas
Black-and-white American television shows
English-language television shows
American teen drama television series
Television series about teenagers
Television shows set in Malibu, California